Berta is a female Germanic name or may also be a colloquial shortening of Alberta or Roberta.

Berta may refer to:

People

Given name
 Berta Berkovich Kohút (1921-2021), survivor of the Auschwitz concentration camp
 Berta Bojetu (1946-1997), Slovene writer, poet and actress
 Berta Cáceres (1971-2016), Honduran (Lenca) environmental activist, indigenous leader
 Berta Castañé (born 2002), Catalan Spanish actress and model 
 Berta Drews (1901-1987), German stage and film actress
 Berta Piñán (born 1963), Spanish (Asturian) writer, politician
 Berta Singerman (1901-1998), Belarusian-Argentine singer and actress
 Berta Vázquez (born 1992), Ukrainian-born Spanish actress, model, and singer
 Berta Zuckerkandl (1864-1945), Austrian writer, journalist, and art critic

Surname
 Elena Berta (born 1992), Italian sailor
 Renato Berta, Swiss cinematographer and film director

Other
 Berta people, an ethnic group from western Ethiopia and eastern Sudan
 Berta language, their language
 Berta (moth), a geometer moth genus
 Berta monastery, a medieval Georgian monastery in modern Turkey 
 Berta, a fictional character on the American sitcom Two and a Half Men, portrayed by Conchata Ferrell
 Berta, a former name of Ortaköy, Artvin, Turkey

See also
Bertha (disambiguation)
Alberta (disambiguation)
Roberta (given name)

German feminine given names